Mario Joyner (born October 3, 1961) is an American stand-up comedian and actor best known as the host of MTV's Half Hour Comedy Hour from 1988 to 1992.

Early life 
He was born on October 3, 1961 in Pittsburgh, Pennsylvania. He attended the University of Pittsburgh, where he was a track athlete.

Career 
He made his film debut in 1987 in Three Men and a Baby, and later starred in Hangin' with the Homeboys and Pootie Tang.

He is a longtime friend and collaborator of comedians Chris Rock and Jerry Seinfeld. He appeared regularly on The Chris Rock Show and Everybody Hates Chris. He also guest starred in the Seinfeld episodes "The Engagement" and "The Puerto Rican Day," playing two different characters, and voiced the character Jackson in the film Bee Movie. He has opened on national tours for Chris Rock (during his "No Apologies" tour) and for Jerry Seinfeld. He appeared in Comedians in Cars Getting Coffee with Jerry Seinfeld in July 2019.

During the October 12, 2010, episode of The Daily Show with Jon Stewart, in an interview with Congressman Eric Cantor, Stewart credited Joyner with the joke: "Sort of in the way that murderers get sometimes, like, 'I found Jesus and I'm OK now.' 'Well, when did you find Jesus?' 'Right after you found me.'"

Filmography

Film

Television

References

External links

"OPERATION:Get Your Funny Back" A short film by Mario Joyner

1961 births
20th-century American comedians
21st-century American comedians
African-American stand-up comedians
American stand-up comedians
Living people
Male actors from Pittsburgh
University of Pittsburgh alumni
Vincennes University alumni
20th-century African-American people
21st-century African-American people